Norman Lascelles Elder (born Wellington, New Zealand 6 April 1896 - died 10 August 1974) was a New Zealand electrical engineer, teacher, and botanist.

References

1896 births
1974 deaths
New Zealand educators
20th-century New Zealand botanists
Scientists from Wellington City
20th-century New Zealand engineers